Dean Collins may refer to:
Dean Collins (dancer) (1917–1984), American dancer
Dean Collins (actor) (born 1990), American actor